The 1959 World Table Tennis Championships women's doubles was the 24th edition of the women's doubles championship.
Taeko Namba and Kazuko Ito-Yamaizumi defeated Fujie Eguchi and Kimiyo Matsuzaki in the final by three sets to nil.

Results

See also
List of World Table Tennis Championships medalists

References

-
1959 in women's table tennis
Table